The 1989 Cal Poly Mustangs football team represented California Polytechnic State University during the 1989 NCAA Division II football season.

Cal Poly competed in the Western Football Conference (WFC). The Mustangs were led by third-year head coach Lyle Setencich and played home games at Mustang Stadium in San Luis Obispo, California. They finished the season with a record of five wins and five losses (5–5, 1–4 WFC). Overall, the team outscored its opponents 230–227 for the season.

Schedule

Notes

References

Cal Poly
Cal Poly Mustangs football seasons
Cal Poly Mustangs football